Babo is a 2019 Indian Marathi language film written by Arvind Jagtap and directed by Ramesh Chaudhary. The background soundtrack was composed by Veerdhaval Patil and the soundtracks were composed by Harsh Karan Aditya (Trineeti Bros), Rohit Nagbhide, Atul Lohar. Mangesh Kangane penned the lyrics for the songs.

Plot Synopisis
People of a small hilly village find out in the news that a Missile led by Korea is heading towards their village and it could be their last day of living. Will the villagers let go of their internal difference and work together and solve the situation?

Cast 
 Manjiri Yashwant as Pintya's wife
 Kishore Chougule
 Madhu as Nandkishor Chougule
 Bharat Ganeshpure
 Kishore Kadam as Madan
 Vijay Kadam
 Amol Kagne as Bablu
 Pratiksha Mungekar as Munni
 Vijay Nikam as Astrologer
 Nisha Parulekar
 Shreya Pasalkar
 Sayaji Shinde as Bhaskar
 Vinod Shinde as Sanju
 Jaywant Wadkar as Father Of Pintyaa

Reception
The Times of India said, "The story is based in a village where word spreads about a missile from Korea headed to crash in the area. The inhabitants fear their well-being and thinking it to be their last day alive, each one wants to spend it in the way they want to. However, in trying to explore this central plot, Babo opens up 15 sub-stories and all of them merely scratch the surface. Had it just focused on the geographical divide, the movie would have touched upon the issue of casteism effectively, with the treatment of a dark comedy."

Soundtrack

References

External links 
 

2019 films
2010s Marathi-language films